Georges Simenon (1903–1989) was a Belgian author.

Simenon may also refer to:
Marc Simenon (1939–1999), Belgian filmwriter, son of Georges Simenon
Tim Simenon, English musician
Paul Simonon (note spelling; born 1955), English musician
Surnames from given names